Olo is a New York City-based B2B SaaS company that develops digital ordering and delivery programs for restaurants. The company’s platform allows customers to place restaurant orders from multiple origination points – from a brand’s own website or app, third party marketplaces, social media platforms, smart speakers, and home assistants. It also provides restaurants with order analytics and other services.

History 
Olo was founded as GoMobo in 2005 by Noah Glass in New Haven. Its initial product was a mobile phone app that allowed users to pre-order food via text message from coffee shops for pick-up. 

In 2010, the company changed its name to Olo ("online ordering") to reflect its change from being a customer-facing application to being a B2B software company, "invisible" to customers, used by restaurants to manage mobile device orders.

Fortune reported in 2015 that restaurants using Olo software had served approximately 10 million customers. 

In 2017, Shake Shack launched the Shake App created by Olo; other restaurant brands using Olo software include Denny’s and Wingstop.

In 2019, Olo formed a partnership with Google to provide the interface between Google Search and other Google applications to connect customers with local restaurants, allowing them to place orders directly, without using third-party ordering apps such as Doordash and Postmates. ChowNow, a competitor B2B restaurant order-management SaaS company, has a similar arrangement with Google.

Olo launched its IPO on March 17, 2021.

Starting in August 2022, Olo stock plunged as restaurants delayed deploying their ordering software.
This was followed by potential securities fraud, an investigation by Kaplan Fox,
and a class action lawsuit by Bernstein Liebhard LLP.

Funding 
The company has raised funds from Founder Collective,  RRE Ventures, Core Capital, PayPal, Staley Capital, the Raine Group, Danny Meyer (CEO of Union Square Hospitality Group), and private investors.

In January 2020, Bloomberg News reported that Olo might be seeking an IPO with a valuation of $1 billion. Those plans were put on hold due to COVID-19. The company went public in March 2021 with a valuation of $3.6 billion.

References

Online food retailers of the United States
Companies listed on the New York Stock Exchange